Brachyiulus lusitanus is a species of millipede in the genus Brachyiulus. It is endemic to Bulgaria.

A case of pseudo-parasitism by this species has been recorded.

References

Animals described in 1898
Julida
Millipedes of Europe